Marki Bey (born March 1, 1947) is an American actress. She is best known for her role as Diana "Sugar" Hill in the 1974 horror blaxploitation zombie film Sugar Hill.

Early life 
Bey was born in Philadelphia, Pennsylvania.

Career 
Bey appeared in five films from 1970 to 1974, then concentrated on television work, appearing in popular television series such as Starsky and Hutch, Baretta and Charlie's Angels.

Since retiring from acting, Bey and her  husband have operated Murder Mystery Cruises in Los Angeles, California.

Personal life 
On April 30, 1974, Bey married Don Fenwick, an actor. Bey is an avid stamp collector.

Filmography

Film
 1970 The Landlord - as Lanie.
 1972 Class of '74 
 1973 The Roommates
 1974 Sugar Hill - as Diana "Sugar" Hill.
 1974 Hangup (aka Super Dude) -as Julie.

Television
The Rookies (1975)
Bronk (1975)
Baretta (1977)
Charlie's Angels (1977)
Switch (1977)
Starsky and Hutch (1977–79)
Trapper John, M.D. (1979)

References

External links 
 
 
 

20th-century American actresses
Actresses from Philadelphia
1947 births
Living people
American television actresses
American film actresses
21st-century American women